Padar (also, Padar-Gyul’Mali) is a village and municipality in the Agsu Rayon of Azerbaijan.  It has a population of 1,624.  The municipality consists of the villages of Padar and Külüllü.

References 

Populated places in Agsu District